Małków  is a village in the administrative district of Gmina Mircze, within Hrubieszów County, Lublin Voivodeship, in eastern Poland, close to the border with Ukraine.

The village has a population of 450. In 2013, the Lasting Memory Foundation erected a memorial to 49 Jews from Chełm-Hrubieszów-Sokal Death March (see: Death marches (Holocaust)) who were murdered in the village of Małków.

References

Villages in Hrubieszów County